Republicans for the Rule of Law is the principal initiative of the conservative, anti-Donald Trump political group Defending Democracy Together, founded by Bill Kristol, Mona Charen, Linda Chavez, Sarah Longwell, and Andy Zwick in 2019. The project, a 501(c)(4) (social welfare) group, created an advertising campaign to pressure Republican members of Congress to "demand the facts" about the Trump-Ukraine scandal during the impeachment inquiry against Donald Trump.

Group
The group describes itself as "life-long Republicans dedicated to defending the institutions of our republic and upholding the rule of law" and primarily consists of traditionally Republican lawyers. The group's legal advisory board includes Charles Fried, who served as U.S. Solicitor General under Ronald Reagan, Wendell Willkie II, grandson of 1940 Republican presidential nominee Wendell Willkie and Chris Truax, the group's spokesman.  Former Republican U.S. Senator Slade Gorton of Washington state also served on the group's board.

Ad campaign
As the movement to impeach Trump got underway, the group spent over $1 million running cable television advertisements on Fox News and MSNBC, calling on Republicans to "demand the facts" about Trump and Ukraine.  The ad campaign, which included digital as well as television advertising, targeted a dozen Republican Senators as well as House swing districts currently represented by Republicans, including Fred Upton (Michigan), Brian Fitzpatrick (Pennsylvania), Will Hurd (Texas), Jaime Herrera Beutler (Washington), and Mark Amodei (Nevada). The group's ad campaigns also accuse Trump of abusing his office to enrich himself, citing Trump's attempt to hold the 2020 G7 summit at Trump's own Doral resort, and encourage Republicans to publicly oppose Trump's efforts to solicit foreign interference in U.S. elections. The ads air on programs that attract Republican voters, including Fox & Friends.  Washington Post columnist Jennifer Rubin calls the ads "devastating" to Trump's credibility.

Affiliated organizations 
In 2020, the organization launched Republican Voters Against Trump for the 2020 U.S. presidential election cycle.

See also
 The Lincoln Project

References

External links
Defending Democracy Together
Republicans for the Rule of Law
Republicans for the Rule of Law YouTube channel

501(c)(4) nonprofit organizations
Republican Party (United States) organizations
Never Trump movement
Political organizations established in 2019
2019 establishments in the United States